Virginia Lee Aveni (née Baldwin; October 5, 1933) is a former member of the Ohio House of Representatives.

Aveni held degrees from the University of Redlands and the University of Arizona and studied at Cleveland State University.

References

Democratic Party members of the Ohio House of Representatives
Women state legislators in Ohio
Living people
Politicians from Selma, Alabama
University of Redlands alumni
University of Arizona alumni
Cleveland State University alumni
1933 births
20th-century American politicians
20th-century American women politicians
21st-century American women